My Dreams Dictate My Reality is the second studio album by French singer-songwriter Soko. It was released on 2 March 2015 through Because Music and Babycat Records. Produced by Ross Robinson, the album features contributions from singer-songwriter Ariel Pink, Revolver guitarist Ambroise Willaume and Warpaint drummer Stella Mozgawa.

The album is a stylistic departure from Soko's early folk-oriented work and takes influences from new wave, gothic rock, post-punk and 80's pop music.

Background
Prior to the recording, Soko tried to contact with The Cure singer and guitarist Robert Smith to ask him to produce her record. She sent a letter to Smith through producer Ross Robinson, who produced The Cure's 2004 self-titled album. Robinson eventually produced the album himself and it was recorded at his Venice Beach studio. Ariel Pink performed on two songs on the album, after Soko guested on two tracks for his 2014 studio album, pom pom.

"Monster Love" was the first track written for the album. It was written after shooting a promo video for the track, "I Just Want to Make It New With You", from her previous album. Soko wrote the track to fill the video narrative after shooting too much footage she liked.

The music video for the track Lovetrap was realised on 23 March 2015. The video futures Soko playing both herself and Ariel Pink. Pink also makes a cameo appearance.

Critical reception

Los Angeles Times critic Randall Roberts gave a positive review to the album, writing: "Hardly an innovation in sound, My Dreams nonetheless sticks because of the artist's way with tone, texture and structure. These are good songs, the kind that linger." Roberts also stated that Soko was "mining retro synths, echoed guitar tones suggestive of New Order and the Cure and hitting the mark without sounding (too) derivative," and noted the Waitresses and The B-52's influences. John Murphy of musicOMH also noted the influence of The Cure and '80s alternative rock over the record, stating that "so gloomy and claustrophobic does it become at times that you fully expect Robert Smith to hove into view." Murphy also concluded: "Although My Dreams Dictate My Reality may not be a perfect return to form, there’s enough quality gathered on it to make us grateful that she had a re-think."

Track listing

Personnel
Credits adapted from AllMusic.

 Soko – vocals, guitar, bass, keyboards, drums, drum machine, layout, photography, production
 Leo Abrahams – additional production, engineering, guitar, hurdy-gurdy
 Daniel Anderson – bass
 Mike Balboa – engineering
 Ryan Baxley – design, layout
 Natalia Bonifaccis – photography
 Michel Comte – cover photo
 Jean Cook – violin 
 Gregg Foreman – bass
 Kenneth Gilmore – drums, guitar, mixing
 Maxime Le Guil – additional production, engineering
 Steve Krolikowski – synthesizer
 Ryan Lallier – drums, guitar
 Josh Lattanzi – guitar
 Stephen Marcussen – mastering
 Ben McConnell – drums
 Stella Mozgawa – additional production, drums, engineering, guitar
 Simon Oscroft – bass, guitar, backing vocals
 Christine Owman – cello, musical saw
 Ariel Pink – vocals, bass, keyboards
 Ross Robinson – production, engineering
 Maxime Sokolinski – photography
 Ambroise Willaume – guitar

Chart positions

References

External links
 

2015 albums
Because Music albums
Albums produced by Ross Robinson
Post-punk albums by French artists
New wave albums by French artists
Gothic rock albums by French artists
Soko (singer) albums